A presidio is a Spanish fortified base established in the early modern era, e.g. in the Mediterranean, the Philippines, or North America.

Presidio may also refer to:
The Presidio (film), a film starring Sean Connery
Presidio, Texas, a place in the State of Texas in the United States of America
Presidio School of Management, an educational institution
Presidio of San Francisco, National Park Service site and former Army base in San Francisco, United States
Presidio of Monterey, California, an active United States Army installation in Monterey, California
AMD Presidio, a computing platform developed by Advanced Micro Devices

See also
State of the Presidi